Gollu (also Romanized as Gollū; also known as Kolālū) is a village in Vilkij-e Shomali Rural District, in the Central District of Namin County, Ardabil Province, Iran. At the 2006 census, its population was 610, in 127 families.

References 

Towns and villages in Namin County